Heremba Bailung  is an Indian physicist.  He is a professor at and the director of the Institute of Advanced Study in Science and Technology.

Education and career
Bailung earned his BSc and MSc from Dibrugarh University, and his PhD from Gauhati University.

Bailung was awarded the Boyscast fellowship by Department of Science and Technology, Government of India to do his post-doctoral at Institute of Space and Astronautical Science in 1998–1999. He was a Visiting Scientist at Institute of Space and Astronautical Science in 2003 and at Yokohama National University in 2008.

Bailung is a specialist in dusty plasma and peregrine soliton. He was associated with Y. Nakamura and Padma Kant Shukla in his work on dusty plasma. He is also involved with research on Bioelectronics and Optoelectronic devices. 
He has conducted many conferences and seminars in different institutions.

References 

21st-century Indian scientists
Plasma physicists
21st-century Indian educators
Living people
1963 births
People from Assam
Dibrugarh University alumni
Gauhati University alumni